The Hundred Flowers Award for Best Cinematography was first awarded by the China Film Association in 1962.

1980s

1960s

References

Cinematography
Awards for best cinematography